Nordneset is a headland at the northern side of Kongsøya in Kong Karls Land, Svalbard. It defines the northeastern extension of the bay Bünsowbukta.

References

Headlands of Svalbard
Kongsøya